Gollijeh (also Romanized as Gollījeh) is a village in Bughda Kandi Rural District, in the Central District of Zanjan County, Zanjan Province, Iran. At the 2006 census, its population was 178, in 37 families.

References 

Populated places in Zanjan County